The Ningaloo Marine Park (formerly known as the Ningaloo Commonwealth Marine Reserve) is an Australian marine park offshore of Western Australia, and west of the Ningaloo Coast. It is one of the 13 parks managed under the North-west Marine Parks Network.

A marine park of the same name lies directly east, but is managed by the Department of Parks and Wildlife of Western Australia.

Conservation values

Species and habitat

 Has a high abundance of Manta Rays within lagoons and outer reef areas.
Foraging areas for vulnerable and migratory whale sharks.
Foraging areas and adjacent to important nesting sites for marine turtles.
Includes part of the migratory pathway of the protected humpback whale.

Bioregions and ecology
The reserve includes shallow shelf environments and provides protection for shelf and slope habitats, as well as pinnacle and terrace seafloor features.
Examples of the seafloor habitats and communities of the Central Western Shelf Transition provincial bioregion.

Conservation Issues 
Climate change is of high concern within this marine park due to effects such as ocean acidification, flooding, storms, and increased wave energy.

History
The marine park was originally proclaimed under the National Parks and Wildlife Conservation Act 1975 on 20 May 1987 as the Ningaloo Marine Park (Commonwealth Waters). The marine park was proclaimed under the EPBC Act on 14 December 2013 as a Commonwealth Marine Reserve and renamed Ningaloo Marine Park on 9 October 2017.

Summary of protection zones
The Ningaloo Marine Park has been assigned IUCN protected area category IV. However, within the marine park there are two protection zones, each zone has an IUCN category and related rules for managing activities to ensure the protection of marine habitats and species.

The following table is a summary of the zoning rules within the Ningaloo Marine Park:

See also

 Protected areas managed by the Australian government

References

External links

 
 North-west Marine Parks Network - Parks Australia
 North-west Marine Parks Network - environment.gov.au (outdated)

Australian marine parks
Ningaloo Coast